Barnett House may refer to:

Barnett-Attwood House, New Edinburg, Arkansas, listed on the National Register of Historic Places listings in Cass County, Arkansas
Tupper-Barnett House, Washington, Georgia, listed on the NRHP in Georgia
Ida B. Wells-Barnett House, Chicago, Illinois, listed on the NRHP in Illinois
Thompson Barnett House, Logansport, Indiana, listed on the National Register of Historic Places listings in Cass County, Indiana
Barnett-Seawright-Wilson House, Delphi, Indiana, listed on the National Register of Historic Places listings in Carroll County, Indiana
Godfrey-Barnette House, Brevard, North Carolina, listed on the National Register of Historic Places in Transylvania County, North Carolina
Barnett-Criss House, Cambridge, Ohio, listed on the NRHP in Ohio
William Barnett House, Alleghany Springs, Virginia, listed on the National Register of Historic Places in Montgomery County, Virginia
Barnett House (Elliston, Virginia), listed on the National Register of Historic Places in Montgomery County, Virginia
Alonzo and Louise Barnett House, Spokane, Washington, listed on the National Register of Historic Places in Spokane County, Washington